If Katie Hopkins Ruled the World was a British television panel show produced by Mentorn Media for TLC, presented by former Apprentice candidate and former newspaper columnist Katie Hopkins.

The first episode was broadcast on 6 August 2015 on TLC. The series ended on 17 September 2015. In December 2015, it was announced that the series would not be re-commissioned for a second series because of low ratings.

References

External links

TLC (TV network) original programming
2015 British television series debuts
2015 British television series endings
English-language television shows